Kentucky Route 622 (KY 622) is a rural secondary state highway in South Central Kentucky. The  route traverses eastern Simpson and south-central Warren Counties.

Route description 

KY 622 intersects KY 100, and then it runs concurrently with KY 585 into Gold City. It enters Warren County before crossing KY 240. It provides access to I-65 and I-165 via KY 9007 at an interchange in Plano before ending at a junction with Scottsville Road (U.S. Route 231, US 231) on the southern outskirts of Bowling Green.

The route is known as Rapids Hickory Flat Road for its course between KY 73 and KY 100.

Kentucky Route 622 is a  state highway that runs from Kentucky Route 73 south of Hickory Flat to TBA via Hickory Flat, Gold City, Temperance,

Major intersections

References

0622
Transportation in Simpson County, Kentucky
Transportation in Warren County, Kentucky